Edwin Cannon may refer to:

 Edwin Bennion Cannon (1910–1963), Utah politician
 Edwin Q. Cannon (1918–2005), Utah politician and businessman